Auldana is a suburb of Adelaide, South Australia in the City of Burnside. It stands on the site of a once-famous vineyard "Auldana" established by Patrick Auld in 1847. Many of the streets are named for grape varieties.

References

Suburbs of Adelaide